Zellatilla is a genus of moths in the subfamily Arctiinae. It contains the single species Zellatilla columbia, which is found in Colombia and on Cuba.

References

Arctiinae